The 1995 Florida State Seminoles football team represented Florida State University in the 1995 NCAA Division I-A football season. The team was coached by Bobby Bowden and played their home games at Doak Campbell Stadium.

Running back Warrick Dunn finished ninth place in the Heisman Trophy voting. Florida State scored 563 points, setting a single-season record.

Schedule

Roster

Rankings

Game summaries

at Virginia

at Florida

vs. Notre Dame (Orange Bowl)

References

Florida State
Florida State Seminoles football seasons
Atlantic Coast Conference football champion seasons
Orange Bowl champion seasons
Florida State Seminoles football